Thibodeau Bay is a freshwater body located in the north central part of the Gouin Reservoir, in the territory of the town of La Tuque, in the administrative region of the Mauricie, in the province of Quebec, in Canada.

This bay extends into the townships of Toussaint (northern part of the bay) and Lemay (southern part of the bay).

Recreotourism activities are the main economic activity of the sector. Forestry comes second. Recreational boating is particularly popular on this water, especially for sport fishing.

The Thibodeau Bay watershed is served on the side by secondary forest roads connected to the R2046 and R1045 forest roads that connect the village of Obedjiwan, Quebec.

The surface of Thibodeau Bay is usually frozen from mid-November to the end of April, however, safe ice circulation is generally from early December to late March. Water management at the Gouin Dam can lead to significant variations in the water level, particularly at the end of the winter when the water is lowered.

Geography

Toponymy
The term "Thibodeau" is a family name of French origin.

The French toponym "Baie Thibodeau" was formalized on December 18, 1986, by the Commission de toponymie du Québec.

Notes and references

See also 

Bays of Quebec
La Tuque, Quebec